The year 2019 is the 2nd year in the history of the Bare Knuckle Fighting Championship, a bare-knuckle fighting promotion based in Philadelphia. The season started with Bare Knuckle Fighting Championship 4: USA vs Mexico. BKFC is available on PPV all over the world and on FITE TV.

Background

BKFC 2019 Awards
The following fighters won the Bare Knuckle Fighting Championship year-end awards for 2019:
BKFC Fighter of the Year 2019: Johnny Bedford
BKFC Fight of the Year 2019: Artem Lobov vs. Jason Knight 1 
BKFC Knockout of the Year 2019: Kaleb Harris against Johnavan Vistante

Lightweight Championship Tournament Bracket

Josue Rivera never arrived at the event, allowing Reggie Barnett Jr to advance to the semifinals by Forfeit.

List of events

Bare Knuckle Fighting Championship 4: USA vs Mexico

'Bare Knuckle Fighting Championship 4: USA vs Mexico' was a bare-knuckle fighting event held by Bare Knuckle Fighting Championship on February 2, 2019 at the Beto Ávila Stadium in Cancun, Mexico.

Background
This was the first international bare-knuckle boxing event by Bare Knuckle Fighting Championship (BKFC).

Results

Bare Knuckle Fighting Championship 5: Lobov vs Knight 

'Bare Knuckle Fighting Championship 5: Lobov vs Knight' was a bare-knuckle fighting event held by Bare Knuckle Fighting Championship on April 6, 2019 at the Mississippi Coast Coliseum in Biloxi, USA.

Background
This event featured a fight between two UFC Veterans, Artem Lobov and Jason Knight in the main event. Also featured on this card was the semi-finals of a 8-Man Lightweight Tournament.

Results

Bare Knuckle Fighting Championship 6: Malignaggi vs. Lobov

'Bare Knuckle Fighting Championship 6: Malignaggi vs. Lobov' was a bare-knuckle boxing event held by Bare Knuckle Fighting Championship on June 22, 2019 at the Florida State Fairgrounds in Tampa, USA.

Background
The BKFC 6 main event was the highly anticipated bout between UFC veteran and The Ultimate Fighter 22 finalist, Artem Lobov against the former IBF junior welterweight and WBA welterweight champion, Paulie Malignaggi. 

On the main card, the fight between Johnny Bedford and Reggie Barnett Jr. was the final in the BKFC Lightweight Tournament. The winner of this tournament was awarded the inaugural BKFC Lightweight Championship and Police Gazette Lightweight American Championship.

Results

Bare Knuckle Fighting Championship 7: Alers vs. Garcia

'Bare Knuckle Fighting Championship 7: Alers vs. Garcia' was a bare-knuckle boxing event held by Bare Knuckle Fighting Championship on August 10, 2019 at the Mississippi Coast Coliseum in Biloxi, Mississippi, USA.

Background
This fight card featured UFC veterans Jim Alers and Leonard Garcia in the main event. The co-main event featured BKFC Heavyweight Champion and Police Gazette Heavyweight American Champion Arnold Adams defending both titles against UFC veteran Chase Sherman.

On the main card, Christine Ferea defended her Police Gazette Women's Featherweight American Championship against Helen Peralta in the first round of a 4-women featherweight tournament. Also announced for this tournament was the eventual cancelled bout of Corrine Laframboise vs. Sadie Ault.

Results

Bare Knuckle Fighting Championship 8: Silva vs. Gonzaga

'Bare Knuckle Fighting Championship 8: Silva vs. Gonzaga' was a bare-knuckle boxing event held by Bare Knuckle Fighting Championship on October 19, 2019 at the Florida State Fairgrounds in Tampa, Florida, USA.

Background
The main event of BKFC 8 is set to feature both UFC veterans and former UFC heavyweight title challengers, Antônio "Bigfoot" Silva vs Gabriel Gonzaga.

Results

Bare Knuckle Fighting Championship 9: Lobov vs. Knight 2

'Bare Knuckle Fighting Championship 9: Lobov vs. Knight 2' was a bare-knuckle boxing event held by Bare Knuckle Fighting Championship on November 16, 2019 at the Mississippi Coast Coliseum in Biloxi, Mississippi, USA.

Background
The card was headline by a rematch between Artem Lobov and Jason Knight. The pair previously fought at Bare Knuckle FC 5 on April 6, 2019 with Lobov winning by unanimous decision.

Results

References

External links
 Official Website
 

Bare Knuckle Fighting Championship
2019 in boxing
2019 sport-related lists